Kuningan City in Jakarta, Indonesia is a mixed-use complex including a shopping mall, two apartment towers and one office tower. It is located in South Jakarta.

The mall is called Kuningan City Mall, the apartment complex is named Denpasar Residence and the office tower is named AXA Tower, named after AXA Mandiri insurance company. The residential complex Denpasar Residence has two towers, named Kintamani Tower and Ubud Tower.

See also

 List of shopping malls in Indonesia
 List of malls in Jakarta
 List of tallest buildings in Jakarta

References

South Jakarta
Shopping malls in Jakarta